Lycée Nelson Mandela is a senior high school in Nantes, France.

It opened on 1 September 2014 with its official inauguration held four days later.  the school has 140-160 teachers, 40-50 technical personnel, and 1,600 students.

References

External links

 Lycée Nelson Mandela 

Lycées in Nantes
International schools in France
2014 establishments in France
Educational institutions established in 2014